FC Gorki is a Belarusian football club based in Gorki, Mogilev Oblast.

History
FC Gorki played in the Belarusian Second League for three seasons (from 2004 till 2006). Before and after this period, they have been playing in the Mogilev Oblast league. 

The club won the Mogilev Oblast league three times (2012, 2013, 2015) and qualified several times for the early stages of the Belarusian Cup in recent seasons.

Current squad
As of October 2022

References

External links
Profile at footballfacts.ru

Football clubs in Belarus
Mogilev Region
Association football clubs established in 2003
2003 establishments in Belarus